Crist is a surname. Notable people with the surname include:
 Alice Guerin Crist (1876–1941), Australian poet, author and journalist
 Carole Crist (born 1969), American businesswoman
 Charlie Crist, American. politician, former Florida governor and member of the House of Representatives
 Chuck Crist (1951–2020), American football safety
 The Crist Brothers (Dave, born 1982, and Jake, born 1984), American professional wrestlers 
 Dayne Crist (born 1989), American football quarterback
 George B. Crist, U.S. Marine Corps General, former Commander of Central Command
 Henry Crist (1764–1844), United States Representative from Kentucky
 John Crist, American decathlete
 Judith Crist, U.S. film critic
 Linda Crist (1944–2005), labanotationist
 Myndy Crist, American actress
 Victor Crist, Republican member of the Florida Senate